QSuper was an Australian superannuation fund based in Brisbane, Queensland. The fund was established in 1912 through an Act of Parliament. The State Public Sector Superannuation Scheme was also known as the QSuper Fund. The board of trustees of the State Public Sector Superannuation Scheme (QSuper Board) was responsible for the management of the QSuper Fund.  On 26 Oct 2015 Michael Pennisi, the chief strategy officer replaced Rosemary Vilgan as CEO, who had served in that position for 18 years.

QSuper was a not-for-profit fund and has a MySuper authority, with around 585,000 members and $113 billion funds under management. The fund is open to all Australians. On 1 December 2016, the Queensland Government passed legislation lifting application restrictions from just government employees and their spouses, which took effect on 30 June 2017. 

On 28 February 2022, QSuper merged with Sunsuper to become part of the Australian Retirement Trust.

Awards 
SuperRatings fund of the year for the 2014/15 and 2015/16 financial years

Chant West Best Fund for Member Services 2016

Chant West Best Fund Innovation Award 2016 

Awarded Pension Fund and Large Fund of the Year at the Conexus Financial Awards 2016

Best Fund: Investments, Chant West 2017 

Pension Fund of the Year, 2018, Conexus 

Pension of the Year 2019, SuperRatings 

Best Pension Fund Manager, 2019, Money Magazine

Investment
There are a range of investment options available to members including an investment strategy that changes dependent upon a member's age and balance.  QSuper has options for members to invest in cash, shares, term deposits and exchange traded funds.

Management 
The CEO was Michael Pennisi, who replaced Rosemary Vilgan in 2015.

Services
Superannuation
Insurance
Financial advice

References

Australian companies established in 1912
Financial services companies established in 1912
Companies based in Brisbane
Superannuation funds in Australia